
Gmina Tuliszków is an urban-rural gmina (administrative district) in Turek County, Greater Poland Voivodeship, in west-central Poland.

Villages
Apart from the town of Tuliszków, Gmina Tuliszków contains the villages and settlements of Babiak, Dryja, Gadowskie Holendry, Gozdów, Grabowiec, Grzymiszew, Imiełków, Józinki, Kępina, Kiszewy, Krępa, Nowy Świat, Ogorzelczyn, Piętno, Ruda, Sarbicko, Smaszew, Tarnowa, Wielopole, Wróblina, Wymysłów and Zadworna.

Neighbouring gminas
Gmina Tuliszków is bordered by the gminas of Krzymów, Malanów, Mycielin, Rychwał, Stare Miasto, Turek and Władysławów.

References
Polish official population figures 2006

Tuliszkow
Turek County